Dark Is the Night is a 2017 Filipino drama film edited, written, and directed by Adolfo Alix Jr. It stars Phillip Salvador, Gina Alajar, Bembol Roco, and Felix Roco. Set in Manila against the backdrop of President Rodrigo Duterte's drug war, the film tells the story of a middle-aged couple trying to leave behind their criminal past, only for their womanizing, marijuana-using son to go missing.

Dark Is the Night had its premiere at the 42nd edition of the Toronto International Film Festival on September 9, 2017. In the Philippines, it was released through the Pista ng Pelikulang Pilipino on August 15, 2018.

Cast
Phillip Salvador as Lando
Gina Alajar as Sara
Bembol Roco as Boss
Felix Roco as Alan
Laurice Guillen as Kidlat

Production
Actors Phillip Salvador and Gina Alajar previously worked together in films such as This Is My Country (1984) and Fight for Us (1989), both directed by Lino Brocka.

Release
Dark Is the Night premiered at the 2017 Toronto International Film Festival on September 9, 2017. The film was released in the Philippines on August 15, 2018 through the 2018 Pista ng Pelikulang Pilipino.

See also
Bato (The General Ronald dela Rosa Story) - Alix's 2019 biographical action film about the police chief who lead Duterte's War on Drugs from 2016 to 2018

References

External links

2017 films
Philippine drama films
Filipino-language films
Films about criminals
2017 drama films
Films directed by Adolfo Alix Jr.